Ronald Caron (December 19, 1929 – January 9, 2012) was a Canadian executive in the National Hockey League (NHL) for the Montreal Canadiens and St. Louis Blues.

Early life
Caron was born in Hull, Quebec (now Gatineau, Quebec), on December 19, 1929. He was a graduate of the University of Ottawa.

Hockey career

Montreal Canadiens
Caron began his career in professional ice hockey as a part-time scout with the Montreal Junior Canadiens in 1959. The team promoted him to head scout in 1968. He succeeded Al MacNeil as head coach of the Montreal Voyageurs for the 1970–71 campaign, but was replaced by Floyd Curry during the season. He was appointed the Voyageurs' general manager the following year. Within the next ten campaigns, he served the team as assistant general manager and director of recruitment and player personnel.

St. Louis Blues
Caron was the general manager of the St. Louis Blues from 1983 until 1994. During his tenure, he was involved in bringing players like Doug Gilmour, Brett Hull, and Adam Oates to St. Louis. Before he was hired by St. Louis, he worked for the Montreal Canadiens as their head scout. He won six Stanley Cup rings with Montreal during the 1970s as the assistant general manager. He was nicknamed "The Old Professor" for his remarkable memory of hockey events.

Death
Caron died on January 9, 2012, at 82 at his home in Montreal.

Awards 

 Stanley Cup Champions 1971, 1973, 1976, 1977, 1978, 1979

References

1929 births
2012 deaths
Montreal Canadiens executives
Montreal Canadiens scouts
Ice hockey people from Gatineau
St. Louis Blues executives
Stanley Cup champions